Riko Urakawa (born 14 January 1998) is a Japanese professional footballer who plays as a defender for WE League club Albirex Niigata Ladies.

Club career 
Urakawa made her WE League debut on 12 September 2021.

References 

Living people
1998 births
Women's association football defenders
WE League players
Japanese women's footballers
Albirex Niigata Ladies players
Association football people from Osaka Prefecture